Çağan is a village and municipality in the Shamakhi Rayon of Azerbaijan. It has a population of 331.  The municipality consists of the villages of Çağan, Birinci Çağan, and İkinci Çağan.

References

Populated places in Shamakhi District